Carlos Alcaraz defeated Casper Ruud in the final, 6–4, 2–6, 7–6(7–1), 6–3 to win the men's singles tennis title at the 2022 US Open. It was his first major title, and he claimed the world No. 1 singles ranking with the win. Ruud, Rafael Nadal, Daniil Medvedev, and Stefanos Tsitsipas were also in contention for the top position. Alcaraz saved a match point en route to the title, in the quarterfinals against Jannik Sinner.

Alcaraz became the youngest major champion since Nadal at the 2005 French Open, the youngest US Open champion since Pete Sampras in 1990, the first man born in the 2000s to win a major singles title, and the youngest man to be ranked world No. 1 in tennis history, surpassing the record Lleyton Hewitt held. Alcaraz also became the third player to reach a major final having won three consecutive five-set matches, after Stefan Edberg at the 1992 US Open and Andre Agassi at the 2005 US Open. At 23 hours and 39 minutes of play duration across his seven matches, Alcaraz spent the longest time on court in major history. Ruud became the first Norwegian man to reach the championship match.

Daniil Medvedev was the defending champion, but lost in the fourth round to Nick Kyrgios. Medvedev became the first man outside the Big Four to be the top seed at a major since Andy Roddick at the 2004 Australian Open.

This marked the third consecutive US Open where a player claimed his maiden major title. The quarterfinal line-up guaranteed a first-time major champion, while the semifinal line-up marked the first time all four players made their US Open semifinal debut since the inaugural edition in 1881. 

Frances Tiafoe became the first American man to reach the US Open semifinals since Roddick in 2006, and the semifinals of any major since John Isner at the 2018 Wimbledon Championships. Moreover, he became the first African American man to reach the US Open semifinals since Arthur Ashe in 1972 and the first African American man to reach any Grand Slam semifinal since MaliVai Washington in 1996. Sinner became the youngest man to reach the quarterfinals at all four majors since Novak Djokovic in 2008. Nadal was vying for a record-extending 23rd major singles title who was on his 22-match major winning streak dated back at the Australian Open, but lost in the fourth round to Tiafoe. That marked the first US Open since 2000 and the first major since the 2017 Australian Open with neither of the top two seeded men reaching the quarterfinals. Three-time champion and nine-time finalist Djokovic withdrew prior to the draw as he could not travel to the United States, due to not having complied with the federal government's vaccination policy for non-US citizens against COVID-19.

This was the first edition of US Open to feature a 10-point tie-break, when the score reaches six games all in the deciding set. Pedro Cachín defeated Aljaž Bedene in the first round in the first main-draw 10-point tie-break at the US Open.

Seeds

Draw

Finals

Top half

Section 1

Section 2

Section 3

Section 4

Bottom half

Section 5

Section 6

Section 7

Section 8

Seeded players
The following are the seeded players. Seedings are based on ATP rankings as of August 22, 2022. Rankings and points are as before August 29, 2022.

Points for the 2021 tournament were not mandatory and are included in the table below only if they counted towards the player's ranking as of August 29, 2022. Players who are not defending points from the 2021 tournament will instead have their 19th best result replaced by their points from the 2022 tournament.

† This column shows either the player's points from the 2021 tournament or his 19th best result (shown in brackets). Only ranking points counting towards the player's ranking as of August 29, 2022, are reflected in the column.

Withdrawn players
The following players would have been seeded, but withdrew before the tournament began.

Other entry information

Wild cards

Source:

Protected ranking

Qualifiers

Lucky losers

Withdrawals
The entry list was released by the United States Tennis Association based on the ATP rankings for the week of July 18.

See also
 2022 ATP Tour
 2022 ATP Finals

Notes

References

External links
 Entry List
 Draw

Men's Singles
US Open - Men's Singles
2022